Olesya Babushkina (Łacinka: Alesia Aliaksandraŭna Babuškina; born 30 January 1989) is a Belarusian rhythmic gymnast. At the 2008 Summer Olympics in Beijing, she won a bronze medal as a member of the Belarusian group.

References

1989 births
Living people
Belarusian rhythmic gymnasts
Gymnasts at the 2008 Summer Olympics
Olympic gymnasts of Belarus
Olympic bronze medalists for Belarus
Olympic medalists in gymnastics
Medalists at the 2008 Summer Olympics
Medalists at the Rhythmic Gymnastics World Championships
Sportspeople from Gomel
21st-century Belarusian women